Sanjurge is a small rural village and former-civil parish in the municipality of Chaves, in the Portuguese district of Vila Real.

Geography
The majority of its residents are seniors due to an out-migration, primarily to the United States and France in the late 1970s, early 1980s. There are two coffee shops and bar, located in the centre of the village, single centenary school and recreation center, near the centre of town.

Architecture
 Cruzeiro de Sanjurge
 Chapel of Nossa Senhora do Rosário
 Church of Santa Clara

Economy
The community is primarily involved in agriculture, with the surrounding parcels dedicated to pasturelands and small crops.

Culture
Sanjurge is recognized for its Presunto (a smoked ham) and Folar (a type of bread with different kinds of meat).

References

Notes

Sources
 Maps, Weather, and Airports for Sanjurge, Portugal (fallingrain.com)

Former parishes of Chaves